Chrysodeixis is a genus of moths of the family Noctuidae described by Jacob Hübner in 1821.

Species
 Chrysodeixis acuta (Walker, [1858]) - Tunbridge Wells gem
 Chrysodeixis argentifera (Guenée, 1852) - tobacco looper
 Chrysodeixis celebensis Dufay, 1974
 Chrysodeixis chalcites (Esper, 1789) - tomato looper
 Chrysodeixis chrysopepla Ronkay, 1989
 Chrysodeixis dalei (E. Wollaston, 1879)
 Chrysodeixis diehli Dufay, 1982
 Chrysodeixis dinawa (Bethune-Baker, 1906)
 Chrysodeixis eriosoma (Doubleday, 1843) - green garden looper
 Chrysodeixis goergneri Behounek & Ronkay, 1999
 Chrysodeixis heberachis (Strand, 1920)
 Chrysodeixis illuminata (Robinson, 1968)
 Chrysodeixis imitans Behounek & Ronkay, 1999
 Chrysodeixis includens (Walker, [1858]) - soybean looper
 Chrysodeixis kebea (Bethune-Baker, 1906)
 Chrysodeixis kebeana (Bethune-Baker, 1906)
 Chrysodeixis keili Behounek & Ronkay, 1999
 Chrysodeixis luzonensis (Wileman & West, 1929)
 Chrysodeixis maccoyi Holloway, 1977
 Chrysodeixis minutoides Holloway, 1985
 Chrysodeixis minutus Dufay, 1970
 Chrysodeixis papuasiae Dufay, 1970
 Chrysodeixis permissa (Walker, 1858)
 Chrysodeixis plesiostes Dufay, 1982
 Chrysodeixis politus Dufay, 1970
 Chrysodeixis similaris Behounek & Ronkay, 1999
 Chrysodeixis similis Behounek & Ronkay, 1999
 Chrysodeixis subsidens (Walker, 1858) - Australian cabbage looper
 Chrysodeixis taiwani Dufay, 1974

References

Plusiinae